A special election for Illinois' 2nd congressional district was held on April 9, 2013, to fill a seat in the United States House of Representatives for Illinois's 2nd congressional district, after Representative Jesse Jackson Jr. resigned on November 21, 2012. The special election was required to be held within 115 days of Jackson's resignation. It was won by Democratic candidate Robin Kelly, formerly the Chief Administrative Officer of Cook County.

Pat Quinn, the Governor of Illinois, set the primary elections for February 26, coinciding with municipal primary elections, and initially set the general election for March 19. However, legislation was enacted at Quinn's request to allow the general election to coincide with municipal general elections held on April 9.

The winner of the Democratic primary was Robin Kelly and Paul McKinley won the Republican Primary. The Green Party nominated 2010 U.S. Senate candidate LeAlan Jones.

Democratic primary

Candidates

Declared
 Anthony Beale, Alderman
 John Blyt
 Patrick O. Brutus
 Clifford Eagleton
 Ernest B. Fenton
 Debbie Halvorson, former U.S. Representative
 Gregory Haynes
 Denise A. Hill, Minister (write-in)
 Robin Kelly, Cook County Chief Administrative Officer (Won primary)
 Fatimah N. Muhammed
 Larry D. Pickens
 Charles Rayburn
 Mel Reynolds, former U.S. Representative
 Jonathan Victor
 Joyce W. Washington, 2004 U.S. Senate candidate
 Anthony W. Williams, Community Activist

Withdrawn
 Donne Trotter, State Senator (endorsed Robin Kelly)
 Napoleon Harris, State Senator (endorsed Robin Kelly)
 Toi Hutchinson, State Senator (endorsed Robin Kelly)

Declined
 Sam Adam Jr., attorney
 Corey Brooks, pastor
 William D. Burns, Alderman
 Jonathan Jackson, civil rights activist and Jackson Jr.'s brother
 Sandi Jackson, Alderman and Jackson Jr.'s wife
 David E. Miller, former state Representative
 Todd Stroger, former President of the Cook County Board of Commissioners

Did not file
 James Hickey, President of the Orland Fire Protection District board and candidate for the 11th congressional district in 2012

Polling

+ Internal poll for Toi Hutchison Campaign
^ Internal poll for Robin Kelly Campaign

Results

Republican primary

Candidates

Declared
 Lenny McAllister, political commentator and former radio show host
 Paul McKinley (Won Primary)
 Beverly E. Reid
 Eric M. Wallace

Withdrawn
 James Taylor Sr., newspaper publisher and candidate for the 2nd congressional district in 2012

Results

Green Party
The Green Party nominated 2010 U.S. Senate candidate and journalist LeAlan Jones to run on the Green Party ticket.

Independent candidates
 Curtiss Llong Bey
 Marcus Lewis, postal worker and candidate for the 2nd congressional district in 2012
 Elizabeth "Liz" Pahlke

Did not file

Socialist Workers Party	
 John Hawkins, communist political organizer

Results

County results

References

External links
Coverage at Ballotpedia
LeAlan Jones For Congress
Robin Kelly For Congress
Marcus Lewis For Congress
Paul McKinley for Congress
Liz Pahlke For Congress

2nd congressional district special election
Illinois 02
2013 02 special
Illinois 2013 02
Illinois 2013 02
United States House of Representatives 2013 02